Dao Bandon (born 4 January 1947 -), is a Thai Luk thung and Mor lam singer-songwriter. He became popular with his song Khon Khee Lang Kway, released in 1977. He has composed many songs for the Thai superstar singer, Jintara Poonlarp, including Rak Salai Dokfai Ban, Jao Bao Hai and Pha Mai Ai Lueam.

Early life and music career
Dao Bandon's real name is Tiem Seksiri. He was born in Yasothon Province. He has seven siblings and since his family was very poor, he left school after grade four. His good memory led him to become a monk.

Tepphabut Satiroadchomphoo suggested to him that he begin singing on stage, so he left the Buddhist monkhood. He began singing on stage in 1977 and gained popularity with the song "Khon Khee Lang Kwai", which he both composed and sang. He then started to write more songs and he built up a reputation for a Mor lam superstar singer Jintara Poonlarp with the song Rak Salai Dokfai Ban in 1998.

Discography

Songs
 Khon Khee Lang Kway
 Ror Rak Tay Ton Kradon

Songwriting

References

Dao Bandon
Dao Bandon
Dao Bandon
Dao Bandon
Dao Bandon
1947 births
Living people
Dao Bandon